MV Iran Shahr-E-Kord is an Iranian-built container ship and the fourth Iranian vessel built by Iran Shipbuilding & Offshore Industries Complex Company (ISOICO) for Iran Shipping Lines (IRISL Group) to fulfill Iran's need for long range shipments. The vessel was launched in 2009 and is expected to enter service by 2013. The ship is able to carry 2,200 containers and has a sister ship, Iran-Arak.

In March 2021, there were reports that the vessel was targeted by an explosive object allegedly launched by Israeli forces which caused some fire, but no one on board was hurt.

References 

Container ships
2009 ships
Ships built by ISOICO
Ships built in Bandar Abbas
Merchant ships of Iran